A courtyard  is a circumscribed area.

Courtyard may also refer to:
 Courtyard by Marriott
 Courtyard house
 Courtyard housing
 Courtyard (solitaire)
 Courtyard Theatre, Stratford-upon-Avon, Warwickshire, England
 Courtyard Theatre, London, England
 Courtyard, Hereford, a theatre and arts venue in Hereford, England
 Courtyard Crisis
 Alan Moore's The Courtyard, a two-issue comic book mini-series
 Courtyard Shopping Centre, a retail complex in County Donegal, Ireland
 Courtyard (film), a 1931 Italian drama film